Endo (derived from "end-of-contract") refers to a short-term employment practice in the Philippines. It is a form of contractualization which involves companies giving workers temporary employment that lasts them less than six months and then terminating their employment just short of being regularized in order to skirt on the fees which come with regularization. Some examples of such benefits contractual workers do not get as compared to regularized workers are the benefits of having an employer-and-employee SSS, Philhealth, and Pag-ibig housing fund contribution, unpaid leaves, and a 13th-month pay, among others.

Overview
The word endo is derived from an abridged version of the phrase "end of contract". Endo is also sometimes referred to as "5-5-5", alluding to the number of months until a non-regular employee's termination or end of contract. Under the Labor Code of the Philippines (PD 442), employers may employ people under a probationary status for, and not exceeding, six months. Under this system, the worker's employment contract ends before the sixth month is completed, and the employee then becomes a regular worker, entitled to several health, security, and insurance benefits prescribed by law.

Contractualization is one of the most controversial labor practices in the Philippines. Since its adoption in 1974, the Labor Code has been amended and attached with several implementing texts. As of June 2016, there are an estimated 356,000 probationary workers in the Philippines.

Types of employment in the Philippines

Regular employment 
A regular employee is defined by the 1974 Labor Code as one who is “engaged to perform activities which are usually necessary or desirable in the usual business or trade of the employer,”

There are two types of regular employees as per the Labor Code of the Philippines: (1) those who are engaged to perform activities which are necessary or desirable in the usual business or trade of the employer; and (2) those casual employees who have rendered at least one year of service, whether continuous or broken, with respect to the activity in which they are employed.

A regular employee is entitled to the following (but not limited to) benefits:

 Social Security System (SSS)
 Private companies are required to register all regular employees in the system (RA 8282). The SSS provides retirement and health insurances.  
 Philippine Health Insurance Corporation (PhilHealth or PHIC)
 Both private and public sector workers ought to be contributors to this service (RA 7875). The corporation sets aside contributions for medical insurance.  
 Home Development Mutual Fund (HDMF or Pag-IBIG)
 This agency allows provides housing loans with low interest, payable up to 30 years. Private and public firms are also mandated to contribute to the fund on behalf of all its regular employees (RA 7835). 
 13th month pay, service leaves, medicare and maternity benefits, etc., union dues (if any)

The above-mentioned pecuniary benefits are deducted by the employer from the gross monthly salary of the employee.

Probationary employment 
In addition to regular employment, probationary employment is also possible through the Code. Under Article 2B1, probationary employment shall not exceed six months “unless it is covered by an apprenticeship agreement stipulating a longer period.” This would mean that any employee working over the stated or agreed period shall be considered as a regular employee.

However, both regular and non-regular employees still enjoy security of tenure, pertaining to the Constitutional guaranty found in Sec. 3, Art. XIII of the 1987 Constitution that no employee, whether regular or non-regular shall be terminated without just causes authorized by the law under Art. 2B2 and Art. 2B3 of the Labor Code. Probationary employees in this case are not entitled to grants enumerated in preceding paragraphs.

Labor-only contracting 
Department Order No. 3 (series of 2001) explicitly prohibits labor-only contracting, defined to be a type of employment wherein: “the contractor or subcontractor merely recruits, supplies or places workers to perform a job, work or service for a principal, and the following elements are present:(a) The contractor or subcontractor does not have substantial capital or investment to actually perform the job, work or service under its own account and responsibility; and (b) The employees recruited, supplied or placed by such contractor or subcontractor is performing activities, which are directly related to the main business of the principal.”Contracts or subcontracts whose existence precede the effectivity of the Order are given non-impairment and non-diminution of benefits."

Government response

Marcos administration
Contractualization has its roots tracing back to 1974 under the rule of Ferdinand Marcos when Ernesto "Boy" Herrera helped draft Presidential Decree 442. This decree which Marcos eventually passed, would give the provisions and grounds for the contractualization of workers in the Philippines.

The Labor Code of 1974 introduced the concept of probationary employment to the Philippines and Under Article 281 it states that "employers are allowed to hire people under a probationary status for up to six months. These 6 months are used as a trial period for the employee. If the employee is allowed to work after the 6 month of the probationary period, he/she will be considered a regular employee." which upon further reading continues as follows “the services of an employee who has been engaged on a probationary basis may be terminated for a just cause or when he fails to qualify as a regular employee in accordance with reasonable standards made known by the employer to the employee at the time of his engagement.” If an employee is unable to show that he/she possesses the necessary skills to keep the job, he/she may be terminated from employment."

Effectively, Article 281 and its legal loophole was spotted by companies and since then has been used as a main basis for laying off workers in order to avoid extra costs for regular employment.

Cory Aquino administration
During the Cory Aquino administration from 1986-1992, Republic Act 6715 of 1989, also known as the Herrera Law, was passed. It was this law that gave the first major revisions to the original Philippine Labor Code drafted earlier during the Marcos Presidency. This revised Philippine Labor Code was amended to fight against the discrimination against women in the work place and aimed to extend the rights of workers under employment. However, this revision under the administration of Corazon Aquino did not tackle contractualization directly and effectively. For example, Article 279 of the labor code was amended to provide better security of tenure for workers. This article states that:

"In cases of regular employment, the employer shall not terminate the services of an employee except for a just cause or when authorized by this Title. An Employee who is unjustly dismissed from work shall be entitled to reinstatement without loss of seniority rights and other privileges and to his full backwages, inclusive of allowances, and to his other benefits or their monetary equivalent computed from the time his compensation was withheld from him up to the time of his actual reinstatement."

This failed to recognize the situation of those employed under a probationary status. Regular employees could not have their services terminated without a just cause, but in order for a probationary employee to attain this regular status, he/she would need to work more than six months.

Ramos administration
President Fidel V. Ramos vowed to end contractualization to address the plight of suffering Filipino people and had the Philippine Labor Code amended to extend the powers of the Secretary of Labor along with the powers of the regional directors in order to more efficiently handle violations of the Labor Code and hopefully taming and curbing the growing problem of exploitative contractualization. The amendment is quoted as follows, Article 106 of the Revised Labor Code, “The Secretary of Labor and Employment may, by appropriate regulations, restrict or prohibit the contracting-out of labor to protect the rights of workers established under this Code.” This amendment to the Philippine Labor Code effectively gives the power of ending or continuing contracting-out of labor into the hands of then DOLE Secretary.

Then-DOLE Secretary Leonardo Quisumbing issued Department Order 10 in May 1997 strengthening the contracting out of labor practice by giving the employers more allowances whilst safeguarding employee rights. Department Order 10 propagated the concept of agencies through "Permissible contracting or subcontracting." It was here when employees started coining the word Endo in response to the 5 months - 5 months - 5 months work schedule of most contractual employees.

It was also this change in provision on the Philippine Labor Code and the DOLE Department Order 10 compounded together which made the problems of Endo worse off in the administration of Fidel V. Ramos.

Estrada administration
With the growing Endo Contractualization practices in the Philippines, also came the growth of a myriad of worker abuse complaints which gave rise to multiple worker protests and led to then DOLE Labor Secretary Patricia Sto. Tomas to pass DOLE Department Order 3 in 2001 which served as a revocation of the previously passed DOLE Department Order 10. This however, also removed the changes to the rights of a contractual employee mention in Department Order 10. These rights included giving contractual employees the same benefits as regular employees, a promise of proper working conditions, service incentive leave, rest days, and overtime pay among others. Department Order 3 also had a section which protected current contracts already in place. Existing contracts between companies and workers had to be fulfilled. Both parties still had rights to the stipulations mentioned in their current contracts.

Arroyo administration
The DOLE Department Order 3, though it did revoke the previous DOLE Department Order 10, was only a temporary solution.

Benigno Aquino administration
Upon the transition of power from the 9-year Gloria Macapagal Arroyo administration the Benigno Aquino III administration started. DOLE Department Order 18 went under review and resulted in a new and improved version of itself with the DOLE Department Order 18-A's release. By this point DOLE has aggressively restricted and regulated the agency contractualization practice that it seemed that the norm is not contractualization whilst regularization being the exemption.

Duterte administration
During his campaign for the 2016 Presidential Election, one of Rodrigo Duterte's promises was the phasing out of contractualization and improvement to labor in the Philippines.

Upon his election, he appoints Silvestre Bello III as Secretary of the Department of Labor and Employment, who considers making all companies put at least 80% of all employees under contract as per the president's orders. By the end of 2016, around 36000 workers have been regularized. Going into 2017, Duterte and Bello aimed for a new permanent policy that would end labor-only contractualization by the end of February, but Bello wound up not signing it. Instead he decided first for dialogue between the president and labor groups in order to get feedback. Eventually President Duterte met with the labor groups as Bello drafts a new Department Order that would stop labor contractualization. 

However, by March 16 Bello signs Department Order 174 which sets stricter guidelines on contractualization but doesn't immediately illegalize it. Duterte however continued his stand against contractualization, promising to sign an Executive Order against it. However, the Marawi crisis ends up postponing the signing.  As of 2018, no Executive Order had been signed by President Duterte regarding the complete abolishment of contractualization. A rally was organized by labor groups on March 15, 2018 in protest against the president's delay of the EO. Eventually on May 1, Duterte signs an EO that would put an end to contractualization, although Labor Groups would criticize the president for his actions since the one signed was not the draft agreed upon with them.

Policies 
According to certain laws under the Philippine employment protection laws employers must offer permanent employment after six months of engagement; otherwise, or otherwise lay them off. (LCP Articles 279, 280, 281, 286 and 287). This is commonly referred to as the regularization law. In addition, in case the company is unable to regularize them, they may hire temporary workers via principals or service contractors.

Movements and notable cases 
In June 2016, the Department of Labor and Employment (DOLE) has started inspecting establishments nationwide as a response to President Rodrigo Duterte's issuance of an Executive Order (EO) banning endo and other similar contracting practices. As of April 2018, the DOLE has inspected 99,526 out of over 900,000 establishments in the country.

According to an initial list submitted to the Malacañang Palace, the DOLE states that there are 3,337 companies suspected of engaging in labor-only contracting. Out of this total, the DOLE has confirmed that 767 companies practice labor-only contracting. This initial list also notes that over 224,000 workers are affected by illegal contracting practice, and a total of 176,286 workers have already been regularized.

Movements

Magnolia Philippines
In a statement released in response to their inclusion in a list of companies without regularized employees, Magnolia Philippines stated the affected workers are not the company's employees but are employed by an unnamed service provider:

"We believe that our inclusion in the list stems not from our contracting of labor but from the use of certain machinery and equipment leased by a DOLE-accredited independent service provider whose workers maintain and operate them. They, not our workers and employees, are the subject of concern of the Department of Labor and Employment (DOLE)."

In the same statement, the company also noted that they have always worked to protect their employees' rights and are coordinating with the DOLE: "We at Magnolia Inc. have always worked to protect the rights of our employees and workers … We acknowledge this issue and continue to coordinate with the DoLE to immediately address the matter. Nevertheless, as a company, we believe that all our partners should exercise the same care that we do when it comes to ensuring that workers’ rights–including security of tenure and all benefits provided for in the Labor Code and prevailing laws–are fully protected. As such, we are committed to working with our providers to ensure this issue is resolved at the soonest time possible."

PLDT
In 2017, DOLE ordered telecommunications conglomerate PLDT to regularize almost 9000 employees. This order came about after DOLE found out that numerous of PLDT's contractual agencies were violating the labor laws of the Philippines. Several agencies denied their workers the rights stated in the Labor Code of the Philippines such as the 13 month pay. PLDT appealed to the DOLE to reconsider this decision, but this was rejected in January 2018, as Labor Secretary Silvestre Bello III said that, "his office found no merit to overturn the order." Some contracting agencies however were found to be legal and the number of employees that were required to be regularized dropped from almost 9000 to about 8000 employees. DOLE also required PLDT to pay about Php 66 million in unpaid benefits.

As of June 2, 2018, PLDT began the process to regularize their employees. They continued to appeal to the DOLE about their decision to shut down all the contracting agencies because this, "would effectively shut down these companies and displace not only the workers deployed to PLDT but also thousands of other workers assigned to other principals."

Notable cases 
DOLE's initial list to the Malacañang identified the top 20 companies suspected or confirmed to practice illegal contracting practices:

See also
Precariat

References

Labor in the Philippines
Temporary employment
Employment in the Philippines
Ethically disputed working conditions